Flood! is a 1976 American made-for-television adventure film directed by Earl Bellamy.

Plot summary
The earthen dam above Brownsville, Texas shows signs of imminent collapse, but the mayor, John Cutler, refuses to act. A maverick town boardmember, Paul Burke, enlists the aid of a helicopter pilot, Steve Brannigan, to save the townspeople.

Cast
Robert Culp as Steve Brannigan
Martin Milner as Paul Burke
Barbara Hershey as Mary Cutler
Richard Basehart as John Cutler
Carol Lynley as Abbie Adams
Roddy McDowall as Mr. Franklin
Cameron Mitchell as Sam Adams
Eric Olson as Andy Cutler
Teresa Wright as Alice Cutler
Francine York as Daisy Kempel
Whit Bissell as Dr. Ted Horne
Leif Garrett as Johnny Lowman
Ann Doran as Emma Fisher
Elizabeth Rogers as Nancy Lowman
James Griffith as Charlie Davis
Edna Helton as Mrs. Wilson
Gloria Stuart as Mrs. Parker
Jack Collins as Jack Spangler

Production
Irwin Allen had huge success with two disaster films. In 1975 he announced he would make three TV movies for ABC, The Forgotten World, Flood and Time Traveller. The film ended up on NBC

In August 1976, Robert Culp and Martin Milner signed to star. Filming started that month at Fern Ridge Reservoir west of Eugene, Oregon.
Filming continued in Brownsville, Oregon and other locations in the area. The Brownsville Christian Church was used as the hospital, while the Brownsville Fire Station/City Hall was used as City Hall, but only for exterior shots, as was Main Street. The nearby Crawfordsville Covered Bridge was used also. Brownsville is also the same town that was used to film many scenes for Stand By Me in 1985.

Reception
The Los Angeles Times said it "fails to offer much excitement".

References

External links

Flood! at TCMDB

Flood! at BFI

1976 television films
1976 films
1970s adventure films
1970s disaster films
1970s English-language films
American disaster films
Disaster television films
Films directed by Earl Bellamy
Films produced by Irwin Allen
Films scored by Richard LaSalle
Films set in Texas
Films shot in Eugene, Oregon
NBC network original films
1970s American films